Madina Masjid is a mosque located on Tariq Road Karachi. It was built in 1980 and affiliated with Jamia Uloom-ul-Islamia, Banuri Town.

In December 2021 The Supreme Court has ordered the demolition of the mosque because it is built in a park.

References

Mosques in Karachi
1980 establishments in Pakistan
Jamia Uloom-ul-Islamia